Shanghai Tang is a Hong Kong luxury fashion house founded in 1994 by Hong Kong businessman David Tang. The brand is known for its luxury homeware collection and fine bone china. In 1998, Richemont acquired David Tang's controlling stake in the business.

David Tang stated that Shanghai Tang is a Chinese label that set out to rejuvenate Chinese fashion of the 1920s and 1930s.  The fundamental design concept is inspired by 1920s Cheongsam combined with the modernity of the 21st century. Shanghai Tang is noted for its use of Chinese culture and heritage in its product styling, branding and marketing.

History

Early years 
Shanghai Tang was partially inspired by Tang's desire to create a global brand that represented China, stating, "as Coca-Cola is American, as Mercedes is German, I think there should be something that is quintessentially Chinese". After founding the China Club in 1991, Tang moved to incorporate his tastes of fusing Shanghainese design with modern style by forming Shanghai Tang in 1994. Its flagship location is on the ground floor of Pedder Building, Central, Hong Kong.

Initially, Shanghai Tang was a fashion house for custom high-end tailoring, employing tailors from Shanghai who left during the Communist Revolution. Tang expanded his business to sell ready-to-wear items in 1996.

Expansion into a global brand, and resulting change 
The late 1990s and early 2000s were marked by change for Shanghai Tang. Tang wanted to turn the company into a global brand, and so his Hong Kong location was followed by 24 outlets worldwide over the years, including Bangkok, Beijing, Honolulu, London, Miami, New York City, Las Vegas, Madrid, Paris, Shanghai, Tokyo, Singapore and Macau. They are often located in well-known areas such as Singapore's Orchard Road, Bangkok's Sukhumvit Road, and Shanghai's Xintiandi.

Shanghai Tang's first American store was opened in New York on November 21, 1997, and in 1998, the Swiss company Richemont bought a controlling stake in the fashion house. However, the New York store, located on Madison Avenue, closed in less than two years due to lower-than-expected sales, relative to the high rent. The store was moved to a smaller venue in 2001.

In 2001, Raphael le Masne de Chermont, from the parent company Richemont, was appointed CEO of Shanghai Tang. In addition, Joanne Ooi joined the company as creative director the same year. As the chief executive, Le Masne de Chermont wanted to figure out a way to cater to both the Chinese and international market, remarking, "[Shanghai Tang was] too dependent on Western people visiting Hong Kong, and we needed to transform the brand into something mainland Chinese wanted to buy". As part of the strategy to revitalize Shanghai Tang, Ooi traveled across the country, taking notes on Chinese culture. She then picked themes based on her notes that formed the basis of the company's seasonal collections. Le Masne de Chermont and Ooi opted to transform the brand from 1930s Shanghai, into a more contemporary style that retained its vibrant colours from previous designs .

Shanghai Tang helped design costumes for the 2004 Yonfan film Colour Blossoms, starring Teresa Cheung.

As part of their focus on the Chinese market, Shanghai Tang created the Mandarin Collar Society in 2007. It is an invitation-only club to promote shirts with a mandarin collar as standard work attire in Asia. Ooi left Shanghai Tang by the end of the following year to work for a biotech company.

Present 
After 17 years, in October 2011, the company's 6,300-square-foot flagship store in Hong Kong's Pedder Building closed, with rising rents being cited as the main reason. Shanghai Tang lost the space to American retailer Abercrombie & Fitch, who were prepared to pay two-and-a-half times the original rent. In the meantime, the company set up several project units to continue its presence in Central, namely "A New Journey as a Nomad of Central", in a series of Mongolian gers on the roof of Central Pier 1 from 4 November to 31 December 2011. This was followed by "Shanghai Tang Loft" in Pedder Building, upstairs to the old store, from 23 October to 20 February 2012.  As of 2018, there are eight stores across Hong Kong as well as stores in Shanghai, Beijing and other Asian cities, along with a string of Shanghai Tang cafes and restaurants in China.

In April 2012, a new flagship store was opened on Duddell Street in Central, called "Shanghai Tang Mansion". At nearly 1,400 square metres, it is Shanghai Tang's largest branch, and was designed by Shanghai-based Design MVW. Shanghai Tang also brought in designer Raffaele Borriello as creative director the same year.

In 2013, Shanghai Tang announced a 12-year partnership with Inter Parfums to create fragrances under the Shanghai Tang name.

In 2014 Shanghai Tang celebrated its 20th anniversary in Shanghai.

In July 2017, Swiss luxury group Richemont announced that it had sold Shanghai Tang to a group of investors headed by Italian entrepreneur Alessandro Bastagli. Bastagli bought the business believing there was potential in Shanghai Tang to grow and attract a younger generation of customers who wanted a Chinese brand. The new owner enlisted his son to assist with product development and marketing. Le Masne de Chermont exited the company that year.

On 4 July 2017, Shanghai Tang creative director Raffaele Borriello died from surgery complications. Founder David Tang died the next month on August 29, 2017. Designer Massimiliano Giornetti was appointed creative director in December 2017.

In December 2018, after disagreements between Bastagli and Hong Kong-based investment partner Cassia Investments, the controlling stake in Shanghai Tang was sold to Chinese group Lunar Capital. Giornetti left Shanghai Tang that month, and Tang's eldest daughter, Victoria Tang, was appointed as creative director.

In 2019, Shanghai Tang celebrated its silver jubilee by collaborating with Chinese artist Xu Bing on calligraphic artwork inspired by Shanghai Tang's vision.

2020 was marked by change for Shanghai Tang: according to Women's Wear Daily, CEO Maurizio de Gasperis left the company in April of that year, with Shirley Tai taking his place. Victoria Tang also announced in November that she would be leaving her creative director role.

See also
Shopping in Hong Kong

References

Further reading 
 
Wu, Zhiyan., Borgerson, Janet  and Schroeder, Jonathan (2013), From Chinese Brand Culture to Global Brands: Insights from Aesthetics, Fashion and History, Basingstoke: Palgrave Macmillan. .

External links

1994 establishments in Hong Kong
Clothing brands of Hong Kong
Clothing retailers of Hong Kong
Clothing companies established in 1994
High fashion brands
Hong Kong brands
Privately held companies of China
Richemont brands